Perevalivka is a village in the Sudak Municipality of the Autonomous Republic of Crimea, a territory recognized by a majority of countries as part of Ukraine and annexed by Russia as the Republic of Crimea.

Previously, the settlement was known as the El-Buzlu village. Following the forced deportation of the Crimean Tatars in 1944, the Presidium of the Supreme Soviet of the Russian SFSR published a decree on May 18, 1948 renaming the settlement along with many others throughout Crimea from their native Crimean Tatar names to their current variants.

Its population was 687 in the 2001 Ukrainian census. Current population:

References

External links
 

Villages in Crimea
Sudak Municipality